Mishab-e Shomali Rural District is in the Central District of Marand County, East Azerbaijan province, Iran. At the National Census of 2006, its population was 14,046 in 3,814 households. There were 13,938 inhabitants in 4,052 households at the following census of 2011. At the most recent census of 2016, the population of the rural district was 14,214 in 4,346 households. The largest of its 14 villages was Dizaj-e Olya, with 2,925 people.

References 

Marand County

Rural Districts of East Azerbaijan Province

Populated places in East Azerbaijan Province

Populated places in Marand County